Myakinino may refer to several places:

 Myakinino (Moscow Metro), a station of the Moscow Metro
 , a village in Kuntsevo District of Moscow, Russia